Emily the Criminal is a 2022 American crime thriller film written and directed by John Patton Ford in his feature directorial debut. It stars Aubrey Plaza as the title character, with Theo Rossi, Megalyn Echikunwoke, and Gina Gershon in supporting roles. The film follows Emily Benetto, a young woman saddled with student debt and locked out of the job market due to a minor criminal record, who gets involved in a credit card scam that pulls her into the criminal underworld of Los Angeles.

Emily the Criminal had its world premiere at the 38th Sundance Film Festival on January 24, 2022, and was theatrically released in the United States on August 12, 2022, by Vertical Entertainment and Roadside Attractions. The film received positive reviews from critics, with praise for its social commentary and Plaza's performance. It earned four nominations at the 38th Independent Spirit Awards, including Best First Feature, with Ford winning Best First Screenplay.

Plot
Emily lives in Los Angeles and is deeply in debt. She struggles to pay off her student loans, largely because a felony conviction prevents her from obtaining a well-paying job. Consequently, she delivers food as an "independent contractor" for a catering company. A co-worker connects Emily to a "dummy shopper" service that promises to make her $200 in one hour.

The service is revealed to be a credit card fraud ring, and Emily meets Youcef, one of its organizers, who instructs her to purchase a flat-screen TV using a fake card and ID. The next day, Emily is sent on a larger job (purchasing a car on a no-limit credit card) which goes poorly after the dealer discovers the scam, leading to a physical altercation.

Youcef tends her wounds and they discuss their aspirations. Emily, an aspiring artist, wishes to visit South America once her loans are paid off, while Youcef plans to purchase a rental property with the money made from the fraud ring. On her request, Youcef teaches Emily how to make fake credit cards on her own. He gives her a taser for protection, and instructs her not to sell stolen goods at her home or scam the same store twice in a week. Youcef lies about his involvement with Emily to his cousin Khalil, with whom he works.

While dogsitting for her childhood friend Liz, a buyer for some of her stolen goods follows Emily to her apartment and robs her of her earnings, taking the dog. She tases the buyer and reclaims both. At a party, Emily learns that there is an opening at Liz's advertising agency, and that Liz has gotten her an interview with Alice, her boss. Emily invites Youcef to the party, which sparks a romance between them.

At a dinner with Youcef's family, Khalil reveals that Emily has been caught hitting the same store twice within a week, prompting the store to post security footage of her online. This leads to a falling-out between Youcef and Khalil, who cuts him out of the fraud ring. Meanwhile, Emily's job interview with Alice goes poorly after she discovers the job is actually an unpaid internship. When Emily objects, Alice insults her, calling her "spoiled".

Youcef reveals to Emily that Khalil had not been paying him for several months. Further, the owner of the rental property he plans to purchase requests an immediate down payment and so he decides to rob the fraud ring itself. Youcef and Emily arrive at the ring's storage unit to find that Khalil has already taken everything, as well as emptying their shared business bank account.

Emily convinces Youcef to confront Khalil at his safehouse, where they attempt to ambush him. Khalil attacks Youcef, severely injuring him, though Emily is able to subdue him using a box cutter. Taking the ring's money and assisting Youcef to his car, she realizes they have lost his car keys and cannot drive away. As police and ambulance sirens draw closer, Emily chooses to abandon him in his car and take the money for herself.

The police eventually raid Emily's apartment and discover she is gone. Now living in South America, she returns to making art. Emily also establishes a credit card fraud ring of her own, recruiting dummy shoppers with the promise of making $200 in one hour, just as Youcef had done.

Cast
 Aubrey Plaza as Emily Benetto
 Theo Rossi as Youcef Haddad, Emily's love interest who introduces her to credit card theft
 Megalyn Echikunwoke as Liz, Emily's best friend
 Gina Gershon as Alice, Liz's boss
 Jonathan Avigdori as Khalil Haddad, Youcef's cousin
 Bernardo Badillo as Javier Santos
 John Billingsley as office manager
 Brandon Sklenar as Brent

Production
In August 2021, Aubrey Plaza, Gina Gershon, Megalyn Echikunwoke, and Theo Rossi were confirmed to star. Filming took place over the course of twenty days in Los Angeles with an additional day of shooting in Mexico. Nathan Halpern composed the musical score.

Emily the Criminal is writer and director John Patton Ford's first feature film. His thesis film at the American Film Institute, Patrol, premiered at the 2010 Sundance Film Festival and made the short list for the 2011 Academy Awards. In writing Emily the Criminal, Ford drew on his own experiences with student debt and working at restaurants. After Plaza read the script, she came onboard as a producer, in addition to agreeing to star in the film.

Themes
Thematically, Emily the Criminal explores harsh realities that resonate notably differently today than they would have in past eras. Critic Sheila O'Malley of RogerEbert.com wrote, "In a different world, a different time, Emily the Criminal may very well have been a romantic drama, similar to Jacques Audiard's Rust and Bone, mixing romance, criminality, class divides, and moral/ethical dilemmas." While these are still aspects in play, they are approached in a matter-of-fact way, without Emily or her counterparts dwelling on them.

Emily finds herself in overwhelming debt compared to previous generations, and her employment options are further limited as she faces discrimination due to her criminal record. She subsequently chooses to work as an independent contractor food in the gig economy, receiving low pay without benefits, and struggles for control over her hours. Unionization and unpaid internship are among other themes addressed.

"The pace of the film is deliberately relentless", stated Vanessa Zimmer of Sundance, with the character of Emily charging "'full-octane' through her difficulties." Confirming this in an American Film Institute interview, writer/director John Patton Ford says he intended "to grab you really unapologetically and just take you on this ride, and to never really give you much of a choice but to watch it…to have that kind of a raw effect upon an audience."

Release
The film premiered at the 2022 Sundance Film Festival on January 24. In February 2022, Vertical Entertainment and Roadside Attractions acquired distribution rights for the United States and Canada, and Universal Pictures acquired international rights. It was released on August 12, 2022. Netflix began carrying the movie in the United States on December 7, 2022.

The film was released for VOD platforms on September 27, 2022, followed by a Blu-ray and DVD release on November 29, 2022.

Reception

Box office
Emily the Criminal grossed $2.2 million in North America, against a production budget of $2 million.

Critical response

 

Plaza's performance and Ford's direction received praise. Deadline Hollywood Damon White wrote: "[While] Ford doesn't insult us with clichés about kick-ass heroines, he does give us a deceptively rich script that explains where Emily has come to—and where she will go, ensuring a satisfying ending that, while dark, doesn't feel too sugar-coated." Kate Erbland from IndieWire gave the film an A– and wrote of Plaza's character Emily: "Is she likable? Is she redeemable? Is she a hero? As Emily might ask, who gives a fuck? With a film and a star this in control of its pitch-black material, she's not wrong. We're just along for the ride, and wouldn't have it any other way." Benjamin Lee of The Guardian gave the film 4 out of 5 stars and praised Ford's direction, calling it "an undeniably striking debut, slick and involving enough to have us curiously excited for whatever he decides to do next".

References

External links
 
 
 

2022 crime thriller films
2022 independent films
2020s American films
2020s English-language films
2022 directorial debut films
American crime thriller films
Films set in Los Angeles
Films shot in Los Angeles
Films shot in Mexico
Roadside Attractions films
Universal Pictures films
Vertical Entertainment films